Jesús Reyes may refer to:
 Jesús Reyes (baseball)
 Jesús Reyes (footballer)
 Jesús Reyes Ferreira, artist and antiques and art collector